The Neversink Mountain Electric Railway ran out of Reading, Pennsylvania onto the summit of Neversink Mountain.

The line started from the heart of the manufacturing center of Reading to the very pinnacle of Neversink. The physical conditions of the route proposed and demanded by travelers was enough to balk any one but a twentieth century engineer. For 12 miles the railway, by a series of curves and only one switch-back, in the path of the electric motor, followed a grade running from 3.4 to 6.4 per cent. After reaching the top the rail road wound its serpentine course down on the other side to Klapperthall Park, passing on its way numberless other pleasure resorts and picnic grounds, through the scenery effected by the valley of the Schuylkill River.

The road began traffic during the summer of 1890; its equipment consisting of cars run by Edison No. 6, double reduction 15-horse- power street car motors. Since then, in view of the fact that the empty cars weigh 13 tons and often carry 100 passengers, all the new cars have two of the new 25-horse-power single reduction motors, which are giving excellent results. 

The cars used were of the Brill double truck pattern. Through the excellence of the motors and construction and the special oil boxes there was almost no noise. 

The power station was situated on the Schuylkill river, at the extreme end of the line. It consisted of two Edison 80-kilowatt generators, driven from counter shafting operated by two turbines. The weight of the cars, the type of rails, and character of the road bed, closely resembled a steam railway line, and indicated that the Edison General Electric Company did not intend to limit their operations to ordinary street car work, and encouraged the building of similar rail roads.

References 

Streetcars in Pennsylvania
Reading, Pennsylvania